This is a list of Spanish television related events in 2008.

Events 
 28 January: Matías Prats becomes first Spanish journalist having hosted 7.000 News progrmas. 
 18 February: TV Channel Factoría de Ficción starts broadcasting.
 29 June: Broadcasting of the final of UEFA Euro 2008 between Spain and Germany, by Cuatro is followed by 14.482.000 viewers (80,9% share).
 1 September: TVE shows its new corporate image.
 19 September: A judge in Barcelona issues a sentence according to which La Sexta is prohibited from showing image previously broadcast by Telecinco.
 27 November: European Commission reportes Spain to the Luxembourg Court for Spanish TV channels exceeding 12 minutes of advertising per hour.

Debuts

Television shows

Ending this year

Changes of network affiliation

Foreign series debuts in Spain

Deaths 
 6 February - Juan Antonio Fernández Abajo, host, 69.
 11 April - Juan Ramón Sánchez, actor, 51.
 15 April - Conchita Bardem, actress, 90.
 23 September - Pedro Masó, director, 81.
 13 November - Julio Riscal, actor, 80.
 15 December - Ángel Quesada, host, 59.

See also
2008 in Spain
List of Spanish films of 2008

References 

2008 in Spanish television